Edwin Wedge (January 28, 1911 – December 26, 1994) was an American speed skater who competed in the 1932 Winter Olympics.

In 1932 he finished fourth in the 10000 metres event.

External links
 Speed skating 1932 

1911 births
1994 deaths
American male speed skaters
Olympic speed skaters of the United States
Speed skaters at the 1932 Winter Olympics